Wahluke High School is a public high school located in Mattawa, Washington that serves 488 students in grades 9–12. 94% of the students are Hispanic, while the other 6% are White.

References

External links
Wahluke H.S.
Wahluke School District

Public high schools in Washington (state)
High schools in Grant County, Washington